Ponsonby is an inner-city suburb of Auckland located 2 km west of the Auckland CBD. The suburb is oriented along a ridge running north–south, which is followed by the main street of the suburb, Ponsonby Road.

A predominantly upper-middle class residential suburb, Ponsonby today is also known in Auckland for its dining and shopping establishments – many restaurants, cafes, art galleries, up-market shops and nightclubs are located along Ponsonby Road.

The borders of Ponsonby are often seen as being rather fluid, taking in St Mary's Bay and Herne Bay to the north and including Freemans Bay to the east and Grey Lynn to the south and west. Ponsonby is properly bounded by Jervois Road to the north, Richmond Road to the south and Ponsonby Road to the east. The area was originally a working class to middle class area.

From the Great Depression until the 1980s it contained many rundown buildings, and had a somewhat 'colourful' reputation. This was partially due to some criminal elements, its many Maori and Pacific Island residents and (from the 1970s onwards) student flats and an association with Auckland's arts and gay/lesbian scenes.

Ponsonby includes an area called Three Lamps which is located at the north end of Ponsonby Road. This name is derived from a 19th-century Lamppost (now reconstructed - see below), There are other locations called Three Lamps for the same reason; intersections in the UK - Crewe and Totterdown in Bristol which might conceivably have influenced the derivation here. There was also a Pub with that name in Swansea, Wales and a location in Macau in China.

The suburb has undergone extensive gentrification over the last two decades. Addresses in Ponsonby have either the 1011 or 1021 postcode.

The main street for which Ponsonby is known is Ponsonby Road, which runs the length of the ridge from the Karangahape Road intersection to the south to the Three Lamps intersection to the north. En route there are three major intersections; Williamson Avenue, which is the main thoroughfare of Grey Lynn to the west, Richmond Road (again to the west), which divides Grey Lynn and Ponsonby and Franklin Road, which is the main road in Freemans Bay to the east.

Name 
The area now referred to as Three Lamps was originally called Dedwood in 1845, after a farm in Shelly Beach Road, which was apparently named after a Captain Dedwood. The name was changed to Ponsonby in 1873, apparently derived from Ponsonby Road which first appears on an 1850s Map of Auckland.
Ponsonby is now applied to a larger area (as described above). There are various people who might have inspired the name Ponsonby:

 Major-General Sir Henry Ponsonby, private secretary to Queen Victoria, 1870–1895
 The Honourable Ponsonby Peacocke, a member of the New Zealand Legislative Council
 Major-General Sir Frederick Cavendish Ponsonby, a cavalry commander in the Napoleonic Wars and later Governor of Malta (and father of Henry Ponsonby)
 Major-General Sir William Ponsonby, a cavalry commander killed at Waterloo

Sir Henry Ponsonby became private secretary to the Queen just before the name change in 1873; it is unlikely however that his name would have been very well known and Ponsonby Road appears as early as the mid 1850s. His surname is thus the least likely source for the naming of the road (and eventually the new name for the suburb)

The Hon. Colonel Stephen Ponsonby Peacocke (also known as Ponsonby Peacocke) was a member of the Legislative Council (1866). He was living on Ponsonby Road in the 1860s and died in 1872. His Christian name is an unlikely source for the naming of the road and there is a map from the mid 1850s showing Ponsonby Road which may predate Peacocke's arrival in New Zealand in 1858.

The Vandeleur connection: It is widely believed that what is now Ponsonby Road was originally called Vandeleur Road, but this is not backed up by evidence. One of the earliest maps of Auckland (1841 by the Surveyor General, Felton Mathew), does show a Vandeleur Road in the general area. However it does not run in the same direction as the existing Ponsonby Road and it was probably never laid out - if it had been it would run north–south and sit between the existing Howe and Hepburn Streets (basically where Western Park is located).

Many of the early street names of Auckland were derived from military men involved in the Napoleonic Wars; this includes Wellington and Nelson. The Ponsonby area contains several examples; Collingwood, Cockburn, Anglesea, Picton, Vandeleur and Ponsonby.

Major-General Sir John Vandeleur was a Divisional Commander at Waterloo and Colonel Frederick Ponsonby was a regimental commander under him. His relative Major-General Sir William Ponsonby was also at Waterloo. Neither Frederick or William Ponsonby or Vandeleur came to New Zealand but they are probably the source for the street names and ultimately the suburb's name.

History

Timeline
 1841 Jane Griffin (Lady Franklin), wife of Sir John Franklin the Governor of Tasmania, visits Auckland. During her time in Auckland she walks up a track in the Ponsonby area subsequently named for her as Franklin Road.
 mid1840s Governor Hobson's secretary James Stuart Freeman lives in the area subsequently known as "Freemans Bay".
 1848 The area now known as Ponsonby is included in the "Hundred of Auckland".
 1851 The "Suburban West Ward" is created which includes what is now Ponsonby.
 1854 James O'Neill's house becomes St. Anne's School for Maori Girls run by the Sisters of Mercy. Responding to a Maori request for holy women to teach the children, the sisters of Mercy had arrived in Auckland from Ireland in 1850 already fluent in the Maori language. Their first school and orphanage was situated near St Patrick's Cathedral.
 1858 The Church of the Immaculate Conception is built (it is demolished in 1869 – 70, the site is now the Pompalier Tennis Club).
 1859 New Street is put through the middle of the St Mary Mount estate and Bishop Pompallier presents land on the eastern side of the street for the creation of St. Mary's College. Almost unaided the sisters erect a three-storey convent building and open it in 1861. The only surviving building from this period is the Kauri St Mary's Chapel constructed in 1865 by Edward Mahoney for £1100.
 1860s Many Roman Catholics buy land in the new subdivisions in order to be near the Catholic centre with its Church, Convent & Schools. Names such as "Dublin" & "Green" reflect this development.
 1860 Bishop Pompallier returns from Europe with a group of French nuns. Under his direction they form the Congregation of the Holy Family, which concentrates on teaching Maori girls.
 1861 St. Anne's boarding school occupies O'Neill's former house.
 1862  The Convent is completed. The new order of the Holy Family takes over teaching at the school. The order now consists of Maori as well as French Sisters.
 1862 The Bishop takes over O'Neill's former house as his official residence.
The Nazareth Institute for Maori and Half-Caste Girls is founded.
 1863 The 1863 map of Auckland shows the road from Karangahape Rd to Franklin Rd labelled as Ponsonby Rd. At this time Jervois Rd is also called Ponsonby Rd. The map does not show the piece of road from Franklin Rd to College Hill that is called Vandeleur Rd.
 1866 All Saints Parish is formed and a Sunday School opened.
 1866 St. Mary's Convent, with its dormitories and Chapel, is built.
 1865-68 The Suffolk Hotel (now the Cavalier Tavern) is built on College Hill.
 1869 - 70 The Convent of the Holy Family is destroyed by fire. The Catholic Bishop is forced by his mortgagee to sell his remaining land, including the Bishop's House. The buyer is a Mr. Bennett who demolishes the Church of the Immaculate Conception. The Bishop resigns and leaves, leading to the dissolution of the order he had formed; the Order of the Holy Family. St. Mary's Convent remains.
 1871 The Ponsonby and Dedwood Highway District is formed.
 1871 Dedwood Post office is opened.
 1872 The Anglican parish of All Saints is officially defined.
 1872 The Ponsonby Anglican householders meet with local Education Board. The schoolroom of All Saints Church is rented at 30 per year to house Dedwood School. By 1874 Dedwood School is attended by 100 girls and 74 boys.
 1873 The name of the area is officially changed from Dedwood to Ponsonby.
 1873 Bishop Croke, the second Catholic Bishop of Auckland, buys back the land with the Bishop's house on it. In 1874 the wooden house is moved to its present location at 57 St. Mary's Road.
 1873 A contest for the design of City Park (now known as Western Park) is held. Sir George Grey and Judge Thomas Gillies donate specimen trees.
 1876 Ponsonby becomes part of the Newton Constituency.
 1876 St Stephens Presbyterian Church, Jervois Rd, is built.
 1877 St Johns Church, Ponsonby Road, is built.
 1879 Western Park opens. However work on the project continues for several decades.
 1879 A school opens in Beresford St known as Harrison's School named after its headmaster.
 1882 Ponsonby is amalgamated with the Auckland City Council area.
 1883 Lieutenant-General Sir William Jervois becomes Governor of New Zealand [1883-1889]. Part of Ponsonby Road is renamed Jervois Road after him.
 1884 The first horse tram service from Queen Street to Ponsonby is started. The route is from Three Lamps to Queen St via K'Rd, Pitt St, & Grey St. The fare is threepence. Trams ran every 15 minutes from 6.30am to 10.30pm at an average speed of  an hour.
 1885 to 1890 An economic slump follows the stock market crash. "[W]hole streets such as John Street and Clarence Street had not a soul living in them. Workmen's cottages handy to Queen Street brought half a crown per week: further out, say Ponsonby, such cottages were gladly let free of rent".
 1886 The water reservoir at the corner of K'Rd and Ponsonby road is built.
 1886 The Ponsonby Baptist Church is built. The 1778 Avery pipe organ is said to be originally from Windsor Castle, a gift from Queen Victoria to Old St. Pauls, Emily Place, which had been demolished the previous year.
 1886 - 1887 The Catholic Church of the Sacred Heart is built on the corner of O'Neill St and Ponsonby Road. This took over the role of Parish Church from St Mary's Chapel.
 1887 The Ponsonby Seventh Day Adventist Church in McKelvie Street is opened.
 1889 The Grey Lynn Borough Council Chambers & Volunteer Fire Station in Williamson Avenue is built by John Mitchell.
 1893 The Ponsonby Catholic Parish School building in O'Neill St is opened; in 1913 when the school is moved to Vermont St the building became a hall.
 1894 The New Bishop's Palace is constructed to the designs of Pugin & Pugin (sons of Augustus Welby Pugin, the Gothic enthusiast responsible for much of the decorative work of the Palace of Westminster). The Bishop's Palace was partly funded by donations from all over the world, including 5000 schools in Europe and the US, the Lord Mayor of London and an Archduchess of Austria. An imposing dark brick gothic pile, it is believed to be the first house in Auckland built to include electric lighting.
 1897 The Catholic Order of the Little Sisters of the Poor is established in NZ. They were first located in a two-storey house in Hepburn St and from 1904 in Tweed St.
 1902 The Ponsonby Fire Station in St Marys Road is built. [Goldsbo'ro & Wade architects]
 1903 The brick building housing the Auckland Gas Company in Beaumont St is constructed.
 1903 3 December after a blazing row the Ponsonby Yacht club take up residence at the Rob Roy Hotel.
 1905 Victoria Park is created. John Court, proprietor of the John Court Department Store donates money for Playground equipment.
 1905 Construction of the City Council Works Depot is started. [now Victoria Park Market]
 1909 The kindergarten in Victoria Park is built. When it encounters financial difficulties in 1910, Logan Campbell purchases it to rescue the institution.
 1911  The Ponsonby Post Office is built. John Campbell - Government Architect [NZ Historic Places Listing]
 1914 The Auckland City Council allocates £3000 for six municipal houses in Clarence Street. This is the council's first venture into public housing.
 1918  The wooden grandstand in Victoria Park is used as a temporary morgue during the great influenza epidemic. From here, the corpses are taken to the train station at the bottom of town and transported out to Waikumete cemetery in West Auckland. In Auckland almost 1,700 people perish.
 1920 Augustus Braithwaite, the Ponsonby postmaster, is murdered at his home in Shelly Beach Rd. The murderer Dennis Gunn was hanged as a result of the first use of fingerprint evidence in a trial in New Zealand.
 1928 The ASB Bank in Jervois Rd is built.
 1942-1945 Victoria Park is occupied by a military camp for WWII American troops. Air-raid drills and black outs are commonplace.
 1956 The electric tram service is discontinued, the tracks are torn up, the overhead wires continue to be used for the electric trolley buses.
 1950s The foreshore of St. Mary's bay disappears under the approaches to the Harbour Bridge. Cut off from the sea a great number of small commercial boat-yards are forced to close and many private boat-slips which have been used for almost a century fall into disuse. The Auckland Harbour Board planned to fill in Westhaven completely, but a group of local residents including engineers and architects donated their services to create Westhaven Marina.
 1960s The motorway viaduct over Victoria Park is constructed.
 1970s The electric trolley bus system is discontinued – the overhead wires are taken down.
 1979 The New Zealand Muslim Association starts construction work on the first mosque in New Zealand at 17 Vermont Street, Ponsonby.
 1980s Assembly of God Church is erected next to the Harbour Bridge approaches at Victoria Park.
 1983 Inactive since 1972, the Destructor at Victoria Park [1915] is saved from demolition by being converted into use as Victoria Park Market.
 ~1984~ Ponsonby Shopping Village is established by Gene and Maneeka Campbell (founders of the Auckland Motor Show). The New Zealand Herald's front-page article for the completion and opening of this building was titled,
 "Ponsonby's on the move again".
 mid 1980s Two high rise apartment blocks are constructed on Jervois Rd. Following this, the Auckland City Council amends the height restrictions to make it impossible for similar buildings to be erected in the future.
 1990s The LGBT presence in the Ponsonby area is expressed by various annual events, such as Coming Out Day parades & The Hero Parade.
 1990s Other festivals develop in the area: the Grey Lynn Festival & Pasifika and the iconic Franklin Road Christmas lights.
 1990s Less restrictive liquor laws result in a large increase in small restaurants & bars. Auckland City Council's relaxation of bylaws prohibiting pavement cafes encourages large numbers of cafes to appear.
 1990s Grey Lynn is granted heritage protection under the building laws. Grey Lynn is the largest concentration of wooden Victorian buildings in the world.
 1990s the Link bus service commences.
 2000 A Supermarket is built on the site of the gasholders at the bottom of College Hill.
 2002 The Auckland Gas Company buildings in Beaumont street are converted into a retail & residential apartment complex.
 2013 2013 sees the return of the LGBT presence in the Ponsonby area with the Auckland Pride Festival Parade

Favoured suburb
From as early as the 1850s St Mary's Bay and Herne Bay were favoured by several prosperous Aucklanders for their harbour views. They built elegant "marine villas" with extensive gardens and private jetties from which they commuted to the bottom of Queen Street. These were largely accessible only from the water as the Ponsonby and Jervois ridges and the area beyond were mostly coarse scrubland. A number of these 'marine villas' still stand, now surrounded by later Edwardian suburban developments.

As College Hill was too steep for horse-drawn vehicles, all traffic from the centre of Auckland came via Karangahape Road (which is why the numbering starts at the K Road end). After the establishment of the horse bus service in the 1880s a small shopping centre developed at the end of the route {what is now Three Lamps but then called Dedwood}. This shopping centre prospered as it was able to serve the larger properties in Herne Bay, the small workers cottages in College Hill and the new middle-class houses of Grey Lynn. Eventually the tram route (first horse drawn and then electric) was extended along Jervois Road, which saw more residential and retail development.

The area now called Three Lamps was originally a farm called "Dedwood", apparently named after a friend of the first owners; a Captain Dedwood, who may, or may not, have served in the armed forces in New Zealand. What is now called Jervois Road was at that time called Ponsonby Road. There was apparently both a Dedwood Road Board and a Ponsonby Road Board as well as references to both a Dedwood District Board and a Ponsonby District Board. Ponsonby definitely sounded more elegant than Dedwood so by the 1870s Ponsonby was apparently used by many people to refer to the whole area. Around 1873 the name was changed from Dedwood to Ponsonby although throughout the mid 1870s public announcements refer to 'Dedwood and/or Ponsonby' just to be safe.

The name change may have sounded better in real estate advertisements, but it initially caused problems; in the New Zealand Herald, Volume X, Issue 3608, 4 June 1873, Page 2 it is mentioned that the change caused problems with the area's membership of both the Harbour Board and the Domain Board as their legal documents specified the Dedwood Road Board and Dedwood District Boards.

(The) Superintendent, should have intimated to the rate-payers of the Dedwood district, that by their adopting a less funereal name they would disfranchise themselves. This problem was eventually sorted out and in any case in 1882 Ponsonby, along with Karangahape and Grafton was amalgamated with Auckland City.

In the 1950s and 1960s a combination of people moving to new outer suburbs, Auckland City Council policy of "slum" clearances and the construction of the motorway through Freemans Bay, led to plummeting rents and a drastic downturn in the economic fortunes of the area directly west of the CBD. The 1950s and 1960s saw many Pacific Islanders arriving in the country and they tended to take up residence in low cost areas - Ponsonby was one of them. By the 1970s, the combination of artists, bohemians, gays and lesbians, and Polynesian migrant workers, attracted by the low rents created a distinct culture in the area, with which the area is still largely identified in the popular imagination of Auckland.

However, beginning in the 1980s a process of gentrification and ethnic transition took place in the area. This was reflective of patterns in other Western cities, but here it dramatically altered the suburb by the late-1990s, as the apparent predominant population of Polynesians was replaced by Pakeha as described in the Ian Middleton novel Mr Ponsonby. By the early 2000s, Ponsonby became widely perceived as a spatial centre of Auckland's so-called creative class.

Upper Middle Class Professionals, usually working in the better-paid professions, as well as the culture industry became an obvious (if not dominant) presence in the area. This also reintroduced many more children into the area; the local schools, which through the 1970s and 1980s had had shrinking roles now started growing in size and the children attending them were now predominantly white rather than brown.

The retail shops changed in character as well. Ponsonby Road was previously lined with second hand appliance & furniture stores, junk shops, Pacific Island fruit & vegetable shops and cheap eateries. By the late 1990s these had been largely replaced with flash bars, restaurants, 'gorgeous things' shops, dress boutiques and upmarket hairdressers. In the 1960s most people regarded Ponsonby as little better than a slum; now it is seen as a place of consumption of up-market consumer goods (particularly clothing) and dining and drinking experiences for the city's upper middle classes.

The 2000s saw a number of traffic accidents (including one death) along Ponsonby Road, which is both an important traffic arterial route and a favourite nightspot. As a result, the speed limit along Ponsonby Road was lowered to 40 km/h zone in 2009.

Notable buildings and landmarks

Notable buildings in the suburb include:

Three Lamps Area

 The Three Lamps. Reconstructed Lamp post with the three distinctive Lanterns that gave this area its name. The Giant Lamp-post (then lit by gas) stood in the centre of the intersection and was removed in the 1930s as a traffic hazard. Three lamps of another design were placed on the corner of the gluepot Tavern to remember the name. After many years of lobbying the old Lamp post has finally been rebuilt next to the former Gluepot. (which still sports the other set of three lamps). On 10 August 2012 the Waitemata Local Board celebrated the "lighting up" and the return of the Three Lamps at the corner of Ponsonby Road and Jervois Road.
 Former Ponsonby Post Office. 1–3 St Marys Bay Road. Architect: John Campbell. Erected in 1911 this is a fine example of the Edwardian Baroque Style. Campbell was Government Architect. Despite what the historic plaque to the right of the front door says, the Postmaster Augustus Braithwaite was not murdered here by Dennis Gunn in 1920 but at his house nearby in Herne Bay. His keys were then used to rob the Post Office.
 Former Ponsonby Fire Station. 15 St Marys Bay Road. Architects; Goldsboro & Wade.
 The Leys Institute. 20 St Marys Bay Road. Library, Lecture Hall and Gymnasium; the gift of local residents William & Thompson Leys in 1905. Wanting to provide resources for working people, including night classes, the Leys brothers created this public facility. Now part of the Auckland Council Public Library system.
 ASB Bank: Jervois Road. This small neo-classical building is one of the many buildings commissioned by the Auckland Savings Bank from the architect Daniel B. Patterson. Similar buildings appear in Auckland suburban centres and in provincial towns throughout the Auckland Province.
 Plunket Rooms and Memorial Drinking Fountain. Jervois Road. Behind the unassuming 1940s modernist Plunket Rooms is a small grassed area with a memorial drinking fountain dedicated to local politician Michael Joseph Savage. Savage was MP for the area as well as local resident. He died suddenly in 1940 while in office as Prime Minister.
 Former Gluepot Hotel. Cnr Ponsonby and Jervois Roads. Its real name was the Ponsonby Club Hotel. Notorious drinking establishment and from the 1960s until its closure in the mid 1990s one of Auckland's premier live music venues. 1930s building replacing a 19th-century structure. now apartments with retail on the ground floor.
 Former Britannia Theatre. 283 Ponsonby Road. Built in 1910 as a roller-skating rink and remodelled as a cinema in the 1920s. Converted into a shopping plaza in 1982 it is now Three Lamps Plaza.
 Renall Street. A Heritage Area. In the 1970s this whole street was demarcated by the Auckland City Council as a special heritage area. The street contains a representative collection of buildings; 19th century workers cottages, Edwardian villas, 1920s bungalows & 1930 houses with an Edwardian Freemasons Hall.
 All Saints Church. Architect; Prof Richard Toy. An award-winning building from the 1950s which replaced an earlier wooden Victorian church.

Ponsonby Road

 Former Letholite Luggage Factory: 239 Ponsonby Road. Erected in 1919 for the firm of Palmer, Collins & Whittaker. The factory was extended in 1929 and in the 1970s the business employed 50 workers, making it an important employer for this area. Letholite was a major supplier of good quality luggage to the New Zealand public. From the 1980s to the late 1990s the building was the location of Joes Bargain House, after which the building was extensively renovated as office/retail space.
 St John's Methodist Church. 229 Ponsonby Road. Architect; Edward Bartley. Built in the 1880s this is a fine example of a wooden church in the Gothic style. This building includes carved detailing by Anton Teutonberg the first European sculptor in New Zealand.
 Doctor's House, 225 Ponsonby Road. From 1908 to 1920 Florence Keller and her husband Martin ran their doctors surgery from this location. The American Florence Keller was a Seventh-day Adventist, who, when she died in her mid 90s was the oldest practising surgeon in the world.
 Terrace Houses, 203–209 Ponsonby Road. Built for E. Marian Edger (sister of Kate Edger and Lilian Edgar). An interesting development dating from around 1900 these brick built houses with cement stucco finish are a half-way point between the London Town houses and the contemporary wooden villas of New Zealand.

Franklin Road intersection

 Vermont Street Shops. 222-224 Ponsonby Road. Fine sey of Edwardian shops - recently restored.
 Ponsonby Mosque. 17 Vermont Street. Built in 1979, this is the first mosque in New Zealand.
 Holmdene - Gentleman's residence in the Italianate style from the 1880s built for shipping magnate Alexander McGregor. This was run as a Boarding House in the 1980s and was popular with Transvestites.
 Braemar Building. Designed by William Holman and built around 1911 for M.G McGregor and Captain J. Smith.
 Franklin Road. The London Plane Trees lining this street were part of the first beautification scheme undertaken by Auckland City Council in the early 1870s. Three streets were planted with trees; Lower Symonds Street, Grey Street (now Greys Ave) and Franklin Road.
 Gloucester Court, 1 Franklin Road. 1935 Art-Deco Apartment building by Horace Massey.

Richmond Road intersection

 Fairfield Terrace 117-131 Ponsonby Rd. Stuccoed brick retail development from around 1910.
 Ponsonby Central. Built as the Allans Calendar Printing Works in the 1950s.
  Leys Block. Queen Anne / Art Nouveau building erected in 1911 for the Leys family. From the early 1980s to the late 1990s this was the location of the popular "Open Late Cafe".
 Former Vogels Bakery. 120-128 Ponsonby Road. In the 1940s a German Jewish refugee and doctor of Philosophy named Max Reizenstein established a bakery. Later sold to Johan Klisser the firm has grown into a major manufacturer of baked goods and specifically Vogel's Bread.

Williamson Avenue intersection

 Former Newton Borough Council Chambers & Fire Station 1889. 1 Williamson Avenue. Architect; John Mitchell. The upper floor was built as offices for the Local Borough Council. In 1898 this part of Newton was renamed Grey Lynn, and then in 1914 it was absorbed into Auckland City and the local government function of this building ceased. Now a cafe/bar.
 Western Park. The city's oldest park, the result of a competition in 1872. Some of the large specimen trees were donated by notable people such as Sir George Grey and Sir Maurice O'Rorke. Park furniture designed in the 1990s by Micheal Von Sturmer, sculptures by John Radford and mosaic panels by Mark Davidson.
 Allendale House. 50 Ponsonby Road. Built for wealthy Saddler George Allen in the 1890s this is one of the most imposing examples of a Victorian Mansion. This house is distinguished by a Turret which afforded the owner a splendid view across Western Park and Freeman's Bay to the harbour.
 The Palace. A group of three Italianate town houses built for Alfred Adams in the 1890s. Adams occupied the middle house for a short time. In the 1970s and 1980s this was the location of "The Palace" Massage Parlour during which time it was painted a bright pink. These houses were built with double storied wooden verandahs similar to nearby Allandale house. Now bereft of these verandahs the houses look slightly bare but actually more italianate in style.

Karangahape Road intersection

 Former ASB Bank. 8 Ponsonby Road. Architect Edward Bartley. Erected in 1884 as a single storeyed building for the Auckland Savings Bank, in 1886 a second storey was added. Currently an Art Gallery. Of special note is the original Gas Street Lamp, one of only three remaining in Auckland.
 Unitarian Church. 1a Ponsonby Road. Architect Thomas White. Built in 1901 and apparently based on a church in Johannesburg, South Africa.
 Former Newton Police Barracks. 1 Ponsonby Road. Designed by the Government architect John Campbell. Built in 1905, an example of the Queen Anne Style. Since the 1970s this has housed Auckland City Council's Community Arts Programmes. Artstation
 Ponsonby Reservoir. The first reservoir on this site was designed by the City Engineer William Errington. That structure from the 1880s was rebuilt in the 1950s when the adjoining Pumping Station and Turncock's house were demolished. This reservoir is gravity fed with water from the Waitākere Ranges.
 VAANA PEACE MURAL. Visual Artists Against Nuclear Arms. In 1985, eight founding VAANA artists: Pat Hanly, Margaret Lawlor-Bartlett, Jill Carter-Hansen, John Nicol, John Eaden, Claudia Pond Eyley, Nigel Brown and Vanya Lowry each painted large panels in the main gallery at Outreach (now Artstation) with members of the public giving verbal encouragement. Master potters Peter Lange and Lex Dawson worked with Master Builder Matt Stafford to fix the panels to the wall. The mural was recreated in 2006 with extra panels being added.

Demographics 

Ponsonby had a population of 5,730 at the 2018 New Zealand census, an increase of 153 people (2.7%) since the 2013 census, and an increase of 243 people (4.4%) since the 2006 census. There were 2,085 households, comprising 2,763 males and 2,967 females, giving a sex ratio of 0.93 males per female, with 951 people (16.6%) aged under 15 years, 1,299 (22.7%) aged 15 to 29, 2,970 (51.8%) aged 30 to 64, and 513 (9.0%) aged 65 or older.

Ethnicities were 83.4% European/Pākehā, 8.8% Māori, 8.6% Pacific peoples, 9.2% Asian, and 3.2% other ethnicities. People may identify with more than one ethnicity.

The percentage of people born overseas was 29.6, compared with 27.1% nationally.

Although some people chose not to answer the census's question about religious affiliation, 58.2% had no religion, 31.2% were Christian, 0.2% had Māori religious beliefs, 1.3% were Hindu, 0.7% were Muslim, 1.0% were Buddhist and 2.4% had other religions.

Of those at least 15 years old, 2,415 (50.5%) people had a bachelor's or higher degree, and 273 (5.7%) people had no formal qualifications. 1,971 people (41.2%) earned over $70,000 compared to 17.2% nationally. The employment status of those at least 15 was that 3,063 (64.1%) people were employed full-time, 639 (13.4%) were part-time, and 144 (3.0%) were unemployed.

While official statistics are not collected, Ponsonby is also popularly imagined as having a large gay population relative to other Auckland suburbs. A survey by the NZ AIDS Foundation has however found that the stereotype seems to be true, and that the area and the directly adjacent suburbs have a (in comparison) very high percentage of gay people, possibly attracted by the fact that they feel more at ease in an environment where gay people are relatively commonplace.

Education
St Paul's College is a state-integrated Catholic boys' secondary school (years 7-13) with a roll of  students.

Rolls are as of  

Other secondary schools nearby include Western Springs College, Auckland Girls' Grammar School and St Mary's College (a Catholic school for girls).

Notable residents
 Ella Yelich-O'Connor/Lorde singer and songwriter.
 Peter Burling sailor.
 Karen Walker designer.
 Andrew Entrican Deputy Mayor of Auckland in the 1890s.
 Captain William Daldy MP. Member of the Auckland Harbour Board - lived Hepburn Street.
 Amey Daldy feminist wife of William and significant member of the Suffrage Movement which secured the vote for women in 1893.
 Freda Stark - Performer and dancer - regarded as the most notorious woman in Auckland. Danced naked, apart from gold paint, on the stage of the Civic Theatre. 
 George Allen - Saddler - built an impressive mansion which still stands opposite Western Park.
 Doctor Florence Keller The American Florence Keller (née Armstrong) was a Seventh-day Adventist, who, when she died in her mid 90s was the oldest practicing surgeon in the world. She lived here from 1908 to 1920.
 Alexander McGregor - local business man - part owner of the Northern Steamship Line and latterly the McGregor Steam Ship Company.
 Michael Joseph Savage Labour Prime Minister and MP for Ponsonby.
 Peter Fraser Prime Minister.
Helen Clark Labour Prime Minister - flatted here for a while with Judith Tizard.
Judith Tizard MP for Central Auckland.
 John Currie Architect - lived at 50 Wood Street.
 Charles Blomfield (artist) Noted New Zealand Landscape painter - lived at 40 Wood Street.
 Betty Wark Social worker and activist - lived in Hopetoun Street.
 Bunny Rigold - 1970s Television presenter - lived at 35 Brown Street.
 Michael Glock - Furniture designer. Remodelled 10 Pompellier Tce in the 1980s Post-modern style (referred to as the "Glock House") and ran a design shop called "Design-Design" at 282 Ponsonby Road.
Gene and Maneeka Campbell, creators of Auckland's 'City of Sails' title, construct Ponsonby's Shopping Village, a multi-storey shopping complex and penthouse on 106 Ponsonby Rd, taking residence in 1984.

Sport
Ponsonby is home to the Ponsonby Ponies rugby league club and Ponsonby Rugby Football Club.

References

The Lively Capital, Auckland 1840–1865 Una Platts, Avon Fine Prints Limited New Zealand 1971.
The Heart of Colonial Auckland, 1865–1910. Terence Hodgson. Random Century NZ Ltd 1992.
Colonial Architecture in New Zealand. John Stacpoole.  A.H & A.W Reed 1976
Decently And in Order, The Centennial History of the Auckland City Council. G.W.A Bush. Collins 1971.
Auckland Through A Victorian Lens. William Main. Millwood Press 1977.

External links

 Ponsonby Business Association (website of the local business association)
 Photographs of Ponsonby held in Auckland Libraries' heritage collections.

Suburbs of Auckland
Waitematā Local Board Area